John Duncan (born August 14, 1958), better known as Big John Duncan, is a musician and guitarist. He is best known as the guitarist for The Exploited during their classic lineup of 1979 – 1984. He played and wrote the music for their albums Punks Not Dead, Troops Of Tomorrow and Let's Start a War. He also played and wrote many of their single releases, the most famous being "Dead Cities" which they performed on Top of the Pops in 1981.

After their American tour in 1983, Duncan quit The Exploited. He then went on to play in several bands including Human Zoo, Crazy Maybe, and Blood Uncles, and then in 1988 joined Goodbye Mr Mackenzie (with future Garbage singer Shirley Manson). In 1992 and 1993 he worked as a backline and guitar technician for the band Nirvana and played guitar with them during their concert in Roseland Ballroom, New York City on 23 July 1993. In the early and mid '90s he played with The Kamikaze Freak Show and the Gin Goblins. Duncan worked with many other bands during his career including Twisted Sister, the Foo Fighters and Ministry.

References

Scottish punk rock guitarists
Living people
1958 births
Musicians from Glasgow
Capitol Records artists
Parlophone artists